= Azzouz =

Azzouz is a given name and a surname. From Ramallah, Palestine, and Zerhoun, Morocco. Notable people with this name include:

- Azzouz Mahgoub, Egyptian lawyer and human rights activist
