= Azzouz Mahgoub =

Egyptian lawyer and human rights defender

Azzouz Mahgoub is an Egyptian lawyer, human rights activist and member of the Egyptian Coordination for Rights and Freedom (ECRF). Mahgoub and Ezzat Ghoneim the head of ECRF went missing in March 2018 after vising Al-Haram police station. Mahgoub was held on state enforced disappearance for five months.

== Arrest and enforced disappearance ==
Mahgoub, a human rights activist defends victims of state arbitrary arrest, enforced disappearance and police torture. On a day in March 2018, Mahgoub went to the Al-Haram police station to defend Mona Mahmoud who was arrested and detained for featuring in a BBC documentary on enforced disappearance where she narrated repeated kidnapping and rape of her. Mahgoub and the head of the Egyptian Coordination for Rights and Freedom, Ezzat Ghoneim were arrested and made to disappear by the police for five months. Appeal by a group of 21 international and local organisations to the Egyptian authorities to release the two men was ignored. While the two were still being held in an unknown location, the police declared them wanted. Two weeks later, the police presented Mahgoub at the Egyptian Criminal Court from where he was sent to Al-Giza Prison. A week later, the prison informed his family that Mahgoub had suffered a nervous breakdown.
